Lucova (Prekmurje Slovene: Lücova) is a small settlement in the Municipality of Gornji Petrovci in the Prekmurje region of Slovenia.

There is a small church in the village. It was built in 1926 in a Neo-Gothic style.

References

External links
Lucova on Geopedia

Populated places in the Municipality of Gornji Petrovci